John Snyder is an American film, stage, television, and voice actor.

Snyder played the gas station man in the 1979 film The Warriors. He portrayed "Soul Hunter #2" in "Soul Hunter" and "Orin Zento" in "By Any Means Necessary", episodes of Babylon 5, and as Aaron Conor in the Star Trek: The Next Generation episode "The Masterpiece Society" also as the Romulan Bochra in the episode "The Enemy".  He appeared in many TV series and films from 1979 to 2004, and appears as Damian in Love Sick Diaries.

Aside from stage and film acting, he has also done voice work in anime and video games for studios, such as Animaze, Bang Zoom! Entertainment and New Generation Pictures.

Filmography

References

External links
 
 

Living people
20th-century American male actors
21st-century American male actors
American male film actors
American male television actors
American male video game actors
American male voice actors
Year of birth missing (living people)